Rachel Louise Hindley (born 30 December 1981) is a New Zealand badminton player. She won the women's singles gold at the Oceania Championships in 2006 and also women's doubles gold in 2008. She competed at the Melbourne Commonwealth Games in the women's singles, doubles, and team event; and reaching the quarter finals in the singles event.

Achievements

Oceania Championships
Women's singles

Women's doubles

BWF Grand Prix
The BWF Grand Prix has two levels: Grand Prix and Grand Prix Gold. It is a series of badminton tournaments, sanctioned by the Badminton World Federation (BWF) since 2007. The World Badminton Grand Prix sanctioned by International Badminton Federation (IBF) since 1983.

Women's singles

Women's doubles

 BWF Grand Prix Gold tournament
 BWF & IBF Grand Prix tournament

BWF International Challenge/Series
Women's singles

Women's doubles

  BWF International Challenge tournament
  BWF International Series tournament
  BWF Future Series tournament

References

External links 
 

Living people
1981 births
New Zealand female badminton players
Commonwealth Games competitors for New Zealand
Badminton players at the 2006 Commonwealth Games